Haworth, Cross Roads and Stanbury is a civil parish in the metropolitan borough of the City of Bradford, West Yorkshire, England.  It contains 86 listed buildings that are recorded in the National Heritage List for England.  Of these, one is listed at Grade I, the highest of the three grades, two are at Grade II*, the middle grade, and the others are at Grade II, the lowest grade.  The parish contains the villages of Haworth, Cross Roads and Stanbury, and the surrounding countryside.  Most of the listed buildings are houses, cottages and associated structures, farmhouses, farm buildings, and shops.  Haworth has associations with the Brontë family who lived in Haworth Parsonage, which is listed at Grade I.  The other listed buildings include churches, chapels and associated structures, textile mills, bridges, public houses, a milepost, a former school, a railway station, a war memorial and a memorial building, and three telephone kiosks.


Key

Buildings

References

Citations

Sources

 

Lists of listed buildings in West Yorkshire